Today (2022) Cambodia has no cathedrals. All the cathedrals in Cambodia were destroyed by the Khmer Rouge regime in the second half of the 1970s.

Former cathedrals 
Battambang Cathedral
Cathedral of Phnom Penh
Preah Meada

References 

Cambodia
Cathedrals
Cathedrals
Cathedrals